Nancy Werlin (born October 29, 1961) is an American writer of young-adult novels. She was born in Peabody, Massachusetts, raised in that state, and graduated with a B.A. in English from Yale College. She was a National Book Award nominee for The Rules of Survival, a winner of the Edgar Award for Best Young Adult Novel for The Killer's Cousin in  1999, and an Edgar award finalist for Locked Inside.

Books 
Are You Alone on Purpose? (1994)
 The Killer's Cousin (1998)
Locked Inside (2000)
Black Mirror (2001)
 Double Helix (2004)
The Rules of Survival (2006)
 Impossible (2008)
 Extraordinary (2010)
 Unthinkable (2013) – sequel to Impossible
 And Then There Were Four (2017)
 Zoe Rosenthal Is Not Lawful Good (2021)
 Healer and Witch (2022)
 Open the nour (2023)

References

External links

 
 Interview by Cynthia Leitich Smith (2001)
 Update interview by Cynthia Leitich Smith (July 2006)
 Q&A With Nancy Werlin by Kit Alderdice, Publishers Weekly, September 11, 2008 
 
 

1961 births
American young adult novelists
American fantasy writers
Novelists from Massachusetts
Living people
Place of birth missing (living people)
American women novelists
Women writers of young adult literature
Edgar Award winners
Women science fiction and fantasy writers
20th-century American novelists
21st-century American novelists
20th-century American women writers
21st-century American women writers
Yale College alumni